Gareth Simpson (born 2 November 1997) is an English born South African rugby union player.

Simpson played in the Currie Cup for Sharks in his native South Africa and also had a stint playing for Wellington in the Mitre 10 Cup in New Zealand before he moved to England. He joined the Worcester Warriors academy in the summer of 2019 having spent the second half of the 2018–19 season on trial at Sixways Stadium. He played regularly for the Cavaliers in the Premiership Rugby Shield and for Stourbridge in National League 2 North.

Simpson played for the Warriors in the Premiership Rugby Sevens Series at Northampton in September 2019. He made his senior debut off the bench in the Premiership Rugby Cup 57–23 victory over Leicester Tigers at Sixways the following week. He scored his first Warriors try when he came on as a replacement in the European Rugby Challenge Cup victory over Enisei-STM in Russia.

Simpson was included in a Gallagher Premiership squad for the first time when he was an unused replacement against Exeter Chiefs in November 2019 and made his debut in the competition at Wasps in August 2020.

Having impressed in the first three months of the 2019–20 season, Simpson signed a two-year contract, his first full-time professional deal, thus promoted to the senior squad from the 2020–21 season.

On 5 October 2022 all Worcester players had their contacts terminated due to the liquidation of the company to which they were contracted.

References

External links
Worcester Warriors Profile
ESPN Profile
Ultimate Rugby Profile
Its Rugby Profile

1997 births
Living people
English rugby union players
Rugby union players from Coventry
Worcester Warriors players
Rugby union scrum-halves
Bath Rugby players
Saracens F.C. players
Western Force players